The sixth edition of the European Short Course Swimming Championships (25 m) was held in the SachsenArena in Riesa, Germany, from December 12 till December 15, 2002.

Medal table

Men's events

50 m freestyle

100 m freestyle

200 m freestyle

400 m freestyle

1500 m freestyle

50 m backstroke

100 m backstroke

200 m backstroke

50 m breaststroke

100 m breaststroke

200 m breaststroke

50 m butterfly

100 m butterfly

200 m butterfly

100 m individual medley

200 m individual medley

400 m individual medley

4×50 m freestyle relay

4×50 m medley relay

Women's events

50 m freestyle

100 m freestyle

200 m freestyle

400 m freestyle

800 m freestyle

50 m backstroke

100 m backstroke

200 m backstroke

50 m breaststroke

100 m breaststroke

200 m breaststroke

50 m butterfly

100 m butterfly

200 m butterfly

100 m individual medley

200 m individual medley

400 m individual medley

4×50 m freestyle relay

4×50 m medley relay

External links
Results book

2002 in swimming
S
2002
International aquatics competitions hosted by Germany
Swimming competitions in Germany
2000s in Saxony
December 2002 sports events in Europe
Riesa
Sports competitions in Saxony